Posad-Pokrovske is a village in Kherson Raion, Kherson Oblast, southern Ukraine. Alternative historical names for the village included Pokrovske and Kopani.

Administrative status 
Until 18 July, 2020, Posad-Pokrovske was located in the Bilozerka Raion. The raion was abolished in July 2020 as part of the administrative reform of Ukraine, which reduced the number of raions of Kherson Oblast to five. The area of Bilozerka Raion was merged into Kherson Raion.

History
Posad-Pokrovske was founded in 1789 as a property of the Imperial Russian Navy. In 1795, there were 19 houses with 91 inhabitants.

During the 2022 Russian invasion of Ukraine the village was liberated by the Ukrainian army.

Demographics
The native languages of Posad-Pokrovske as of the Ukrainian Census of 2001 were:
 Ukrainian 90.97%
 Russian 8.22%
 Moldovan (Romanian) 0.38%
 Belarusian 0.04%
 Others 0.39%

References

Notes

Villages in Kherson Raion
Chornobaivka rural hromada
Populated places established in 1789